Zanjan and Tarom (electoral district) is the biggest electoral district in the Zanjan Province of Iran. It has a population of 532,111 and elects 2 members of parliament, except that in the first legislative election it had 3 MPs.

1980
MPs in 1980 from the electorate of Zanjan. (1st)
 Mostafa Naseri 
 Mohammad Shjaei
 Mohammad Rajaeian

1984
MPs in 1984 from the electorate of Zanjan. (2nd)
 Mostafa Naseri
 Asadollah Bayat-Zanjani

1988
MPs in 1988 from the electorate of Zanjan And Tarom. (3rd)
 Asadollah Bayat-Zanjani
 Davud Haji-naseri

1992
MPs in 1992 from the electorate of Zanjan, Zanjan And Tarom. (4th)
 Ahmad Hakimipour Zanjan
 Mostafa Naseri Zanjan and Tarom

1996
MPs in 1996 from the electorate of Zanjan. (5th)
 Javad Bagherzadeh
 Gholamhosein Jalil-Khani

2000
MPs in 2000 from the electorate of Zanjan, Zanjan And Tarom. (6th)
 Abulfazl Shakuri Zanjan
 Afzal Mousavi Zanjan and Tarom

2004
MPs in 2004 from the electorate of Zanjan and Tarom. (7th)
 Rafat Bayat
 Jalal Hosseini

2008
MPs in 2008 from the electorate of Zanjan and Tarom. (8th)
 Jamshid Ansari
 Sadollah Nasiri Gheydari

2012
MPs in 2012 from the electorate of Zanjan and Tarom. (9th)
 Mohsen Alimardani
 Mohammad Esmaeili

2016

Notes

References

Electoral districts of Zanjan Province
Tarom County
Zanjan County
Deputies of Zanjan and Tarom